HMS Pegasus was an aircraft carrier/seaplane carrier bought by the Royal Navy in 1917 during the First World War. The ship was converted to operate a mix of wheeled aircraft from her forward flying-off deck and floatplanes that were lowered into the water. Pegasus spent the last year of the war supporting the Grand Fleet in the North Sea, but saw no combat. She spent most of 1919 and 1920 supporting British intervention against the Bolsheviks in North Russia and the Black Sea. The ship remained with the Mediterranean Fleet until 1924, but was placed in reserve in 1925 after a brief deployment to Singapore. Pegasus was sold for scrap in 1931.

Design and description
She displaced . On sea trials in December 1914, Pegasus made  and reached . The ship was converted from coal to fuel oil at the suggestion of her builders. Her crew numbered 258, including 100 aviation personnel.

Pegasuss main armament consisted of four 40-calibre,  12-pounder 12 cwt guns. Two of these were mounted on the forecastle as low-angle guns, but the other two were mounted aft as anti-aircraft guns. They had a rate of fire of 15 rounds per minute.

HMS Pegasus was fitted with a flying-off deck forward, intended for aircraft with wheeled undercarriages, and a prominent hangar aft. Two electric cranes were fitted aft and a twin-boom derrick forward to handle her aircraft. The smaller forward hangar was built under the ship's bridge and the aircraft were raised to the flight deck overhead by one of the first lifts in the Royal Navy. The forward hangar could fit five single-seat fighters and the rear hangar had a capacity of four floatplanes. When Pegasus commissioned in 1917 she was assigned four Short Type 184 torpedo bombers and four Beardmore W.B.III fighters. In late 1918 she carried four Sopwith Camel 2F.1, one Type 184 and three Fairey Campania reconnaissance aircraft. In 1919 she began to operate various models of the Fairey III.

Pegasus carried  of petrol for her aircraft. Her magazines had the capacity for eight  torpedoes, 72 , 108 , and 68, later 84,  bombs.

Career 
HMS Pegasus was laid down in 1914 by the John Brown & Company of Clydebank, Scotland as SS Stockholm for the Great Eastern Railway Company, but her construction was suspended by the beginning of the First World War. The ship was purchased by the Royal Navy on 27 February 1917 and was launched on 9 June 1917. She was commissioned on 14 August 1917 and completed on 28 August 1917. She joined the Grand Fleet on completion and was assigned to support the Battle Cruiser Force. She participated in a few uneventful operations in the North Sea, but was mostly occupied with pilot training and ferrying aircraft to ships equipped with flying-off platforms. Pegasus supported the British intervention in the Russian Civil War between May to September 1919 and was based at Archangel. The ship returned to Rosyth and was briefly decommissioned. She recommissioned on 2 December 1919 and was transferred to the Mediterranean Fleet in March 1920. Pegasus ran aground on 9 March off Kerch, but was pulled off without suffering any significant damage. She supported the Evacuation of Novorossiysk by the Whites later that month and remained with the fleet until 1924. In 1923 the forward flying-off deck was removed and the ship was re-rated as an aircraft tender. She was stationed at Singapore in 1924–25. On 5 July 1925 she was placed in reserve at Devonport, but was briefly recommissioned in 1929. On 22 August 1931 the ship was sold for scrap at Morecambe.

Notes

Footnotes

References

Seaplane carriers of the Royal Navy
Ships built on the River Clyde
1917 ships
Allied intervention in the Russian Civil War
World War I aircraft carriers of the United Kingdom